The Dardanelle Post Office, originally the Dardanelle Agriculture and Post Office, is a historic government building at 103 North Front Street in downtown Dardanelle, Arkansas.  It is a single-story brick building, with a hip roof.  It has a five-bay front facade, with a center entrance flanked by pilasters and topped by a panel, transom window, and dentillated entablature.  Built in 1937, it has modest Colonial Revival style, and is most notable for the mural in the lobby, painted in 1939 by Ludwig Mactarian, and entitled Cotton Growing, Manufacture and Export.

The building was listed on the National Register of Historic Places in 1998.

See also 

National Register of Historic Places listings in Yell County, Arkansas
List of United States post offices

References

External links

Post office buildings on the National Register of Historic Places in Arkansas
National Register of Historic Places in Yell County, Arkansas
Colonial Revival architecture in Arkansas
Government buildings completed in 1938
Individually listed contributing properties to historic districts on the National Register in Arkansas
1938 establishments in Arkansas
Dardanelle, Arkansas